Wien Krottenbachstraße is a railway station serving Döbling, the nineteenth district of Vienna.

References 

Krottenbachstraße
Austrian Federal Railways